Nicholas Templeman (by 1478 – between 1515 and 1520), of Dover, Kent, was an English politician.

Templeman was a member of Parliament (MP) for Dover in 1512 and 1515.

References

15th-century births
1515 deaths
Members of the Parliament of England for Dover
English MPs 1512–1514
English MPs 1515